State of calamity, in the context of disaster management in the Philippines, refers to a status that could be declared widespread within the country, or certain localities, in response to a destructive, natural, or man-made disaster. This measures allows the release of "calamity funds" allocated to local governments and control the pricing of basic commodities in the affected areas.

Background
Under the Philippine Disaster Risk Reduction and Management Act of 2010 (Republic Act 10121), a "state of calamity" is defined as "a condition involving mass casualty and/or major damages to property, disruption of means of livelihoods, roads and normal way of life of people in the affected areas as a result of the occurrence of natural or human-induced hazard".

Declaring a state of calamity
The National Disaster Risk Reduction and Management Council (NDRRMC) shall recommend to the President of the Philippines the declaration of a group of barangays, municipalities, cities, provinces, and regions under a state of calamity, and the lifting thereof, based on the criteria set by the NDRRMC. The President's declaration may warrant international humanitarian assistance as deemed necessary. A state of national calamity is effective until the President lifts the same.

State of calamity could also be declared or lifted by a local government unit's sanggunian or legislature, upon the recommendation of the local disaster risk reduction and management council (LDRRMC) concerned, based damage assessment and needs analysis.

If a state of calamity is declared by the Philippine national government, the following measures will be imposed:
Appropriation for calamity funds
Price freeze for basic necessities
Granting of no-interest loans.

State of national calamities
The following is a list of state of national calamities declared by the president of the Philippines.

Notes

See also
 Disaster area
 State of emergency

References

Emergency management
Disaster management
Emergency management in the Philippines
Emergency laws in the Philippines